Microsoft Stream is a corporate video-sharing service which was released on June 20, 2017 that replaced the existing Office 365 Video.

In 2021 Microsoft announced Stream would be re-platformed onto SharePoint and fully integrated into Office 365. Several new capabilities were announced and introduced during 2021 and 2022. These include new Stream web and mobile apps, integration of videos into Microsoft Search, automatic transcription in multiple languages, viewer analytics and video chapters.

See also
 Microsoft mobile services
 MSN Soapbox
 Bing Videos

References

Microsoft Office-related software
Video
Collaborative software
2017 software